William Langley may refer to:

William Langley of the Langley Baronets
William Langley (actor)